"Long Ago Tomorrow" is a song written by Hal David and Burt Bacharach for the 1971 film The Raging Moon (US title Long Ago, Tomorrow). It was originally recorded by B. J. Thomas in 1971.

Chart performance 
In the US, "Long Ago Tomorrow" reached No. 61 on the Billboard Hot 100 and No. 13 on the Easy Listening chart.

References 

1971 singles
B. J. Thomas songs
Songs with lyrics by Hal David
Songs with music by Burt Bacharach
1969 songs